Qazan Daghi (also Romanized as Qāzān Dāghī; also known as Qārān Dāghī) is a village in Qaqazan-e Sharqi Rural District, in the Central District of Takestan County, Qazvin Province, Iran. At the 2006 census, its population was 63, in 15 families.

References 

Populated places in Takestan County